Fill Me with Life is a 2000 Spanish drama film directed by Josecho San Mateo which stars Unax Ugalde and Pilar López de Ayala alongside Juan Díaz. It is based on the novel Báilame el agua by Daniel Valdés.

Plot 
Set in Madrid, the plot tracks the downward spiral of the couple formed by María and David into drug use, prostitution, organised crime, and social exclusion.

Cast

Production 
Based on the novel by Daniel Valdés, the screenplay was written with the collaboration from Ricardo González Iglesias and Mónica Pérez Capilla. The film was produced by Plot Films alongside Els Quatre Gats and Cre Acción Films.

Release 
Selected for the official competition slate of the 45th Valladolid International Film Festival (Seminci), the film was presented in October 2000. Distributed by Lauren Film, the film was theatrically released in Spain on 3 November 2000.

Reception 
Ángel Fernández-Santos of El País deemed the film to be a "lively and undoubtedly risky fiction", "but stylistically it does not live up to that risk and ambition, and it is stammering and imprecise" vis-à-vis the depiction of the "hellish dumps where the human plunderings of drug and juvenile destitution rot in Madrid".

Accolades 

|-
| align = "center" | 2001 || 45th Sant Jordi Awards || Best Actress || Pilar López de Ayala ||  || align = "center" | 
|}

See also 
 List of Spanish films of 2000

References 

Films based on Spanish novels
Films about substance abuse
Films about prostitution in Spain
Films set in Madrid
2000s Spanish films
2000s Spanish-language films
Spanish drama films
2000 drama films